Hector Mor Maclean of Dowart (circa 1600–1626), or Eachann Mór Maclean in Scottish Gaelic, or Hector the Great, was the 16th Clan Chief of Clan MacLean from 1623 to his death in 1626. Mór or Mor translates as great when added to a name in Scottish Gaelic. He resided at Duart Castle on the Isle of Mull. He was the first Chief of MacLean to not produce an heir in four hundred years, breaking the direct male line from Gillean of the Battle Axe, the founder of the clan to himself. He was succeeded by his younger brother, Lachlan Maclean, 1st Baronet.

Biography
He was the first son of Hector Og Maclean, 15th Clan Chief and Janet MacKenzie of Kintail, the daughter of Colin Mackenzie of Kintail. Hector became Clan Chief at the death of his father in 1623.

Hector Mor was married to Margaret Macleod, eldest daughter of Sir Roderick Macleod of Macleod, 15th Chief, and died without having any children in 1626. He was succeeded by his younger brother, Lachlan Maclean, 1st Baronet. His widow married Eneas MacDonnell, 7th of Glengarry.

Ancestors

References

Hector
1600s births
1626 deaths